City of Torment is the second novel in the Abolethic Sovereignty series written by Bruce Cordell and published in September 2009.

Plot summary
Raidon Kane travels to the underground fortress of the slumbering aboleths, intending to kill the Eldest in its sleep. A warlock, an arch fey, a pirate, and a high priestess of the Abolethic Sovereignty all have their own intentions for the Eldest.

Reception
One reviewer stated: "With City of Torment, Cordell cements himself as one of fantasy's most compelling authors and a boon to the continued allure and lore of the Realms. His voice is fresh, his prose is quick and sharp, and his characters able to feel realized while still leaving a few layers to peel away as the saga hurtles toward its conclusion -- one this reader is eagerly anticipating."

References

2009 American novels

American fantasy novels
Forgotten Realms novels
Novels by Bruce Cordell